Horace Mann Elementary School, schools named after Horace Mann, may refer to:
 Horace Mann Elementary School (Bakersfield, California)
 Horace Mann Elementary School (Cherry Hill, New Jersey)
 Horace Mann Elementary School (Newton, Massachusetts)
 Horace Mann Elementary School (Oak Park, Illinois)
 Horace Mann Elementary School (San Jose, California)
 Horace Mann Elementary School (Tacoma, Washington)
 Horace Mann Elementary School (Bayonne, New Jersey)
 Horace Mann Elementary School (Washington, DC)
 Horace Mann Elementary School (Wichita, Kansas)
 Horace Mann Elementary School (West Allis, Wisconsin)
 Horace Mann Elementary School (Iowa City, Iowa)